Archduke was the title borne by rulers of the Archduchy of Austria, and later by other members of the Habsburg family.

Archduke may also refer to:
 Archduke (butterfly), a genus of butterflies
 Archduke (horse), a racehorse
 Archduke Trio, a piano trio by Ludwig van Beethoven

See also 
 List of rulers of Austria